Notochthamalus scabrosus, the only species in the genus Notochthamalus, is a species of barnacle found along the south-western and south-eastern coasts of South America, from Peru to the Falkland Islands. The species is found almost exclusively higher in the intertidal zone than the mussel Perumytilus, often codistributed with the confamilial barnacle Jehlius cirratus and Balanus flosculus.

Diagnosis and discussion

Notochthamalus is composed of 6 compartmental plates, composed of a carina, rostrum, and paired carinolatera and rostrolatera. Sutures between plates made up of poorly developed oblique folded laminae with membraneous basis. Plates are colored dull purplish brown, weathering to gray. Free-growing shellis are conic, crowded colonies become cylindrical, with plate sutures obscured. Opercular plates are narrow and deeply interlocked. The interior of the tergum shows a tergal depressor muscle pit with overhang and no crests, or only relics thereof. Neither shell nor opercular plates show secondary fusion with age. The best character for field identification are the undulations along the tergal-scutal margins. Given the overall appearance of the operculum of Notochthamalus, it is sometimes called the "vampire barnacle".

Nomenclature and synonymies

Notochthamalus
 Notochthamalus , 1987; (original description).
 Type species: Chthamalus scabrosus , 1854: 468, original designation by Foster & Newman, 1987, and by monotypy.

Notochthamalus scabrosus
 Chthamalus scabrosus , 1854;468 (original description): Newman & Ross, 1976,42 (see for pre-1976 bibliography).
 Notochthamalus scabrosus. Foster & Newman, 1987, (generic re-assignment): , (discussion, supplementary description).
 Type locality: Not given in Darwin, 1854, or Pilsbry, 1916.
 Type specimens: Not given in Darwin, 1854. Pilsbry's 1916 reference specimens from Valparaiso, Chile are USNM No. 48089.323

Geographic range and habitat
Notochthamalus scabrosus prefers exposed upper littoral habitats, and can be found on the South American coastline from Peru through Chile, Chiloe Archipelago, and Tierra del Fuego. It co-occurs there with Jehlius cirratus. In the Atlantic Ocean, it is very common on the Falkland Islands.468

References

External links 

Barnacles
Crustaceans of the Atlantic Ocean
Crustaceans of the eastern Pacific Ocean
Monotypic arthropod genera